Reverend Alexander McCaul (16 May 1799 – 13 November 1863) was an Irish Hebraist and missionary to the Jews.

Life
McCaul, the son of Alexander McCaul (a cordwainer) was born to a Protestant family in Dublin, 16 May 1799. He was educated at a private school, and entering Trinity College Dublin, 3 October 1814, graduated B.A. 1819, and proceeded M.A. 1831; he was created D.D. in 1837. He was for some time tutor to the Earl of Rosse, and then, was sent in 1821 to Poland as a missionary, by the London Society for Promoting Christianity among the Jews.

McCaul studied Hebrew and German at Warsaw, and at the end of 1822 went to St. Petersburg, where he was received by Alexander I of Russia. Returning to England, he was ordained and served the curacy of Huntley, near Gloucester, where he became close to Samuel Roffey Maitland. In 1823 he married and returned to Poland, living at Warsaw as head of the mission to the Jews, and English chaplain, until 1830. He was supported by the Grand Duke Constantine, but had disputes with the Lutheran congregations. Moving to Berlin, where he was befriended by George Henry Rose, the English ambassador, and by the Crown Prince of Prussia, who had known him at Warsaw.

To improve his health McCaul visited Ireland, and returned for a short time to Poland in 1832. Deciding to settle in London, he took up residence in Palestine Place, Cambridge Road and actively supported the London Society. He assisted in founding the Jews' Operatives Converts Institution, and in 1837 started the publication of Old Paths, a weekly pamphlet on Jewish ritual, which continued for sixty weeks.

In 1840, McCaul was appointed principal of the Hebrew college founded by the London Society; and in the summer of 1841, through Frederick William IV of Prussia, he was offered the bishopric of Jerusalem, but declined it because he thought it would be better held by one who had been a Jew. His friend Michael Solomon Alexander was appointed, and McCaul succeeded Alexander as professor of Hebrew and rabbinical literature at King's College, London. In 1846 he was also elected to the chair of divinity. 
 
In 1843, McCaul was appointed rector of St James Duke's Place, London. In 1844 he became prebendary of St Paul's Cathedral, and in 1847 declined Archbishop William Howley's offer of one of the new colonial bishoprics. In 1850 he became rector of the united parish of St Magnus-the-Martyr. When the sittings of Convocation were revived in 1852, McCaul was elected proctor for the London clergy, and represented them for the rest of his life. At first strongly opposed to the revival of the ancient powers of convocation, he modified his views and worked with the High Church party, opposing the relaxation of the subscription to the 39 articles.

McCaul died at the rectory, St Magnus-the-Martyr, near London Bridge, on 13 November 1863. He is buried in the City of London Cemetery in the north-east of the city.

Works
McCaul's major works:

 Plain Sermons on subjects Practical and Prophetic (1840).
 A Hebrew Primer (1844).
 Warburtonian Lectures (1st ser. 1846; 2nd ser. 1852).
 Rationalism, and the Divine Interpretation of Scripture (1850).
 The Old Paths (1854).
 Some Notes on the first chapter of the Book of Genesis (1861; criticism of Essays and Reviews).
 Testimonies to the Divine authority of the Holy Scriptures (1862).
 Reasons for Holding Fast the Authorized English Version of the Bible
 An Examination of Bishop Colenso's Difficulties with regard to the Pentateuch (1863–4,  2 vols. McCaul seconded George Anthony Denison's motion for the appointment of a committee — of which he was then a member — for the consideration of John Colenso's works on the Old Testament).

Family
Married in 1823, McCaul left several sons. His daughter, Elizabeth Anne (1825–1921), writer and social activist,  married James Finn, Consul to Ottoman Palestine, and founded the Distressed Gentlefolk's Aid Association, now known as Elizabeth Finn Care.

References

Attribution

Further reading
 Finn, Elizabeth Anne (1929). Reminiscences of Mrs. Finn. London: Marshall, Morgan and Scott.

External links

 
 Works by Alexander McCaul, at Hathi Trust

1799 births
1863 deaths
Church of Ireland priests
Hebraists
Christian Hebraists
Irish Christian missionaries
Criticism of Judaism
Jewish–Christian debate
Missionary linguists